Jotus auripes is a species of jumping spider of the genus Jotus. J. auripes was first described by the German arachnologist Ludwig Carl Christian Koch in 1881.

References

Salticidae
Spiders described in 1881